The Reformed Political League (GPV) was an orthodox Protestant political party in the Netherlands. The GPV is one of the predecessors of the Christian Union. The party was a testimonial party.

History

1948–1963
The GPV was founded in 1948 as the result of a theological conflict within the Reformed Churches in the Netherlands, which led to the creation of the Reformed Churches in the Netherlands (Liberated). In 1944 a group of orthodox Protestants left the Reformed Church, because they disagreed with Abraham Kuyper's view that God had created multiple branches of Christianity (Catholicism, Protestantism etc.), each with their own sphere.

In 1948 adherents of the Reformed Church in the Netherlands (Liberated) left the Anti-Revolutionary Party, the party linked to the Reformed Church in the Netherlands. On 1 April 1948 they founded the GPV during a congress Amersfoort. Former ARP MP Albertus Zijlstra chaired the congress, and also led the party in its early years.

The party was specifically linked to the liberated Reformed Church. Membership of the church was a pre-requisite for membership of the party. This dogmatic position isolated the party.

The party participated, without success in the 1948, 1952 and 1956 general elections. After the 1956 elections the number of seats in parliament was extended, therefore the number of votes needed to obtain a seat was decreased from one percent of vote to two-thirds of one percent of vote. In the 1959 general election it appeared that the GPV had won a seat. Its sole MP, Laning, was asked to visit the queen to advise her on the formation of a new cabinet. After the results were calculated exactly, however, it became clear that the GPV had obtained too few votes for a seat.

1963–2003

In 1963 the party finally entered the House of Representatives in the person of Pieter Jongeling, who was made top candidate on advice of prominent professor of theology J. Kamphuis. In the 1967 general elections they were able to retain their one seat. During the early 1970s a group called Nationaal Evanglisch Verbond (NEV) had left the ARP because they thought the party's alliance with the Catholic People's Party was wrong. They asked the board of the GPV whether they could join their party. This was rejected by the board of the GPV, who said that the party was open only to members of the liberated Reformed Church. This group would later become the Reformatory Political Federation (RPF). In the 1971 general election the party was able to obtain a second seat, which it managed to retain in 1972. In the 1977 general election Jongeling was replaced by Verbrugh and the party lost one seat. Before the 1981 general election, Verbrugh was replaced by Schutte, who would lead the party until 2001. He was able to retain the one seat in 1981, 1982 and 1986 general elections, and he won a second seat in 1989. In the 1994 genera; election the party retained its two seats. In 1993 the GPV officially opened itself to non-liberated members. This started a slow process of cooperation between the GPV and the RPF, another orthodox Protestant party. From the 1998 general election onwards, the two parliamentary parties began to cooperate, holding common meanings and appointing common spokespersons. The fact that the GPV had only two seats and the RPF three inhibited the cooperation. In 1999 their parliamentary parties in the Senate officially merged, forming one parliamentary party. In 2001 the same happened in the House of Representatives. In 2002 general election the GPV and RPF presented a common electoral list of candidates for the House of Representatives, entering the elections as the Christian Union: they obtained four seats. In 2003 the GPV officially disbanded, making its merger into the Christian Union final.

Name
The GPV chose the name Gereformeerd Politiek Verbond (Reformed Political Alliance), because it wanted to convey that it was a reformed party, and that its organisation was decentralised: the GPV was primarily an alliance of local branches.

Ideology and issues
In its first years the GPV did not have a separate election manifesto or manifesto of principles. Instead it claimed to base its policy directly on the bible. In 1967 the first manifesto of principles was published, in which the party again stressed that the Bible was the basis of their policy. The party saw the Netherlands as a Protestant nation, which should be defended.

In practice this meant that the GPV took the following stances:
The GPV was against European Integration, because it distrusted the Catholic nature of the project;
The party was in favour of a strong defense;
The GPV was staunchly monarchist because it saw the Dutch Monarchy as a God-given institution;
Originally the party wanted the government to decrease its influence on society, allowing for private initiative and civil society to take over some of its functions; during the 1980s the party wanted to retain the welfare state and paid attention to the environment;
The GPV defended the system of special schools, which allowed for schools to be founded on liberated reformed principles;
The party favoured the independence of South Maluku and Irian Jaya, and supported Apartheid in South Africa ;
As an orthodox Christian party the party was against the Dutch policy on soft drugs, same-sex marriage, prostitution, abortion and euthanasia

Leadership and support
This table shows the GPV's results in elections to the House of Representatives, Senate and European Parliament, as well as the party's political leadership: the fractievoorzitter, is the chair of the parliamentary party and the lijsttrekker is the party's top candidate in the general election, these posts are normally taken by the party's leader. The membership of the GPV is also represented.

*: in a combined parliamentary party with the RPF;
**: in a combined parliamentary party with the Reformatory Political Federation and the Political Reformed Party.

Municipal and provincial government
The party had some representatives in the provincial legislatives of Gelderland, Utrecht and South Holland, which form part of the Dutch Bible belt it also held some representation in Groningen. It never cooperated in any provincial executives.

The party had several mayors in small municipalities in the Dutch Bible belt. In the same region the party cooperated in local executives.

Electorate
The GPV's electorate was almost entirely made up out of members of the Reformed Churches in the Netherlands (Liberated). These were concentrated in Gelderland, Utrecht and South Holland, which form part of the Dutch Bible belt, and Groningen

Organisation

Organisational structure
The highest organ of the GPV was the congress, it is formed by delegates from the municipal branches. It convenes once every year. It appoints the party board and decides the order of candidates on electoral lists for the Senate, House of Representatives and  European Parliament, and has the last word on the party program. The party secretariat was located in Dordrecht and later in Amersfoort.

Linked organisations
The party published Ons Politeuma ("Our citizenship"). It scientific institute was the Groen van Prinsterer Stichting ("Groen van Prinsterer Foundation") and its education institute was Mandaat - Gereformeerd Politiek Vormingswerk ("Mandate, Reformed Political Education work"). Its youth organisation was the Gereformeerde Politieke Jongeren Club ("Reformed Political Youth Club"), which published Plein ("Square") and Stand-By.

Pillarised organisations
The party had a small liberated Reformed pillar around, consisting out of like minded organisations. Most prominent was the Reformed Churches in the Netherlands (Liberated). The paper Nederlands Dagblad was closely linked to the GPV, until 1974 Pieter Jongeling, who also led the parliamentary party, led the paper. The Kampen Theological University of the Reformed Church (Liberated) was also linked to the liberated Reformed Church.

Relationships to other parties
Before 1981 the party was very isolated, this was caused by their own dogmatic position on non-liberated Christians. Nonetheless the knowledge and conscience of its MPs was respected throughout parliament.

After 1981 the party began to cooperate with more with other parties, especially with the orthodox Protestant Political Reformed Party (SGP) and Reformatory Political Federation (RPF). In 1981 the GPV allowed municipal branches to cooperate with branches of other parties, this led to the formation of several combined lists with either the SGP or RPF or both. In 1984 the party entered in the European elections with a combined list the RPF and SGP. It won only one seat. In 1994 they were more successful and won two seats, one of which was taken by the GPV.

In 1993 the party allowed non-liberated to become member of the party, this started a slow cooperation process with the RPF which resulted in the fusion in the Christian Union in 2003.

International Comparison
Internationally the party was comparable to the American Christian Right and the small Protestant parties of Scandinavia, such as the Christian Democratic Party of Norway, the Swedish and Danish Christian Democrats. The party has never been in a government coalition however, instead it has chosen to voice its concerns with government policy, while acknowledging that they are not big enough to force their opinion upon others.

Literature
 Klei, E.H.,  'Klein maar krachtig, dat maakt ons uniek'. Een geschiedenis van het GPV, 1948-2003 (Amsterdam 2011).

Notes

References

Christian Union (Netherlands)
Confessional parties in the Netherlands
Defunct Christian political parties
Defunct political parties in the Netherlands
Political parties established in 1948
Political parties disestablished in 2003
Protestant political parties
Conservative parties in the Netherlands
1948 establishments in the Netherlands
2003 disestablishments in the Netherlands